The Mystic Generating Station is a power station in the state of Massachusetts (on the border between Everett and Boston) which has the highest nameplate capacity of any station in the state. It is capable of burning both natural gas and petroleum, but mostly burns natural gas.

The plant currently consists of eight separate generating units; Mystic 8 and 9 are combined cycle natural gas units with a total of four combustion turbines and two steam turbines which can produce 1414 MW total, Mystic 7 is a natural gas or petroleum unit which produces 576 MW, and Mystic Jet is small petroleum fueled unit which produces 8.6 MW in periods of high demand. Mystic Station is scheduled to retire in mid-2024.

History

In the mid 1990s, the state of Massachusetts began to deregulate the electrical market. This led to the sale of the Mystic Generating Station to Sithe Energies who started a large capital investment in the construction of Mystic 8 and 9 which was completed in 2003.  Sithe was acquired by Exelon in late 2003 who ran into financial difficulties which resulted in BNP Paribas taking control of the station.  BNP Paribas sold the station soon after its acquisition to Boston Generating.  Boston Generating ended up declaring chapter 11 bankruptcy in 2010 and was sold to Constellation Energy. Constellation Energy and Exelon merged in March 2012, returning ownership to Exelon. Constellation owns and operates the station following spin-off from Exelon in 2022. 

The Toxics Action Center has targeted the Mystic Generating Station as one of the five largest polluting power stations in the state. Other groups have also become concerned that the plant relies too heavily on Distrigas Liquefied Natural Gas from Yemen which has been experiencing political unrest.

Changes in the wholesale energy markets left Mystic uneconomical to operate under most conditions, leading Exelon to apply to close Mystic from 2022. ISO New England ordered units 8 and 9 to remain operational until the transmission system could be upgraded under a FERC Order 1000 competitive solicitation. Once an upgrade project was selected ISO-NE announced that Mystic Station would be allowed to fully retire on June 1, 2024. Mystic Generating Station's peaking capabilities will be replaced by transmission grid enhancements built on existing National Grid and Eversource properties, a solution known as "Ready Path".

In March 2023, Wynn Resorts acquired 45 acres of the site for $25,000,000.

See also
 List of largest power stations in the United States
 List of power stations in Massachusetts

References

Oil-fired power stations in Massachusetts
Natural gas-fired power stations in Massachusetts